The Town of Granby is the Statutory Town that is the most populous municipality in Grand County, Colorado, United States. The town population was 2,079 at the 2020 United States Census.

History
The town was founded in 1904 along the route of the Denver, Northwestern & Pacific Railway and was incorporated one year later. It was named after Granby Hillyer, a Denver lawyer who later served as the United States Attorney for that city's district.

Many Granby and Grand County residents are descended from pioneer settlers who arrived before the country was fully surveyed. Early families established themselves under the Homestead Act of 1862, which allowed easy access to land to those who would inhabit and improve upon the territory.

Since the turn of the century, families have contended for prime ranch land. The Hudlers and Cooks are descended from original homesteaders.

Bulldozer rampage
Marv Heemeyer was a local auto muffler shop owner and entrepreneur who was denied access to his own business property when a factory was approved by the city and built, cutting off his road access. The city later prevented him from building a new driveway that would again allow his business to operate. Later his connection to the local sewage line was destroyed by construction of the neighboring factory, but the city fined him for the damage caused by the new factory construction.

On June 4, 2004, Heemeyer went on a rampage through town, driving a modified bulldozer. Several buildings were damaged, including a bank, a hardware store, the concrete company, a utility service center, the town hall, the police department, and a former mayor's home, all involved in Heemeyer's business having been destroyed. The rampage lasted 2 hours and 7 minutes, ending when the bulldozer got stuck attempting to go through the alleyway of Gambles Hardware Store. Heemeyer then committed suicide with a handgun. No other deaths occurred, but an estimated $7 million in damage was done.

Geography 

U.S. Route 40 passes through the center of town as Agate Avenue, leading south and east over Berthoud Pass to the Denver area, west  to Hot Sulphur Springs, the Grand County seat.

Climate
This climate type is dominated by the winter season, a long, bitterly cold period with short, clear days, relatively little precipitation mostly in the form of snow, and low humidity.  According to the Köppen Climate Classification system, Granby has a subarctic climate, abbreviated "Dfc" on climate maps.

Demographics

As of the census of 2000, there were 1,525 people, 579 households, and 390 families residing in the town. The racial makeup of the town was 96.26% White, 0.46% African American, 0.26% Native American, 0.98% Asian, 0.07% Pacific Islander, 1.44% from other races, and 0.52% from two or more races. Hispanic or Latino of any race were 3.61% of the population.

There were 579 households, out of which 37.3% had children under the age of 18 living with them, 55.3% were married couples living together, 7.6% had a female householder with no husband present, and 32.5% were non-families. 21.9% of all households were made up of individuals, and 6.4% had someone living alone who was 65 years of age or older.  The average household size was 2.59 and the average family size was 3.05.

In the town, the population was spread out, with 28.1% under the age of 18, 9.1% from 18 to 24, 33.5% from 25 to 44, 22.7% from 45 to 64, and 6.6% who were 65 years of age or older.  The median age was 34 years.  For every 100 females, there were 98.6 males.  For every 100 females age 18 and over, there were 104.3 males.

The median income for a household in the town was $46,667, and the median income for a family was $55,250. Males had a median income of $35,455 versus $24,417 for females. The per capita income for the town was $21,224.  About 4.0% of families and 5.8% of the population were below the poverty line, including 3.9% of those under the age of 18 and 9.0% of those ages 65 and older.

Transportation 

Amtrak, the national passenger rail system, provides daily service to Granby, operating its California Zephyr daily in both directions between Chicago and Emeryville, California, across the bay from San Francisco.

Granby-Grand County Airport , a small airport one mile east of town, serves as a stopover for transient general aviation flights, as well as hosts some local aviation activity. Services at the airport are limited to aviation fuel for both piston and jet/turboprop aircraft. According to the Official Airline Guide (OAG), the airport was previously served by Rocky Mountain Airways which operated scheduled passenger flights to Denver during the mid 1970s with small de Havilland Canada DHC-6 Twin Otter turboprop aircraft.

Notable residents
Penny Rafferty Hamilton, aviation educator, writer, and photographer
Marv Heemeyer, perpetrator of the Granby Rampage, in which he built and operated an armoured Komatsu D355A bulldozer dubbed the "Killdozer of Granby"

See also

Colorado
Bibliography of Colorado
Index of Colorado-related articles
Outline of Colorado
List of counties in Colorado
List of municipalities in Colorado
List of places in Colorado
Arapaho National Forest
Arapaho National Recreation Area
Front Range
Middle Park (Colorado basin)
Rocky Mountain National Park

References

External links
Town of Granby website
CDOT map of the Town of Granby
Granby Chamber of Commerce
Sky-Hi News, Granby's local newspaper
Photographs from the Denver Public Library, now kept at the Library of Congress

Towns in Colorado
Towns in Grand County, Colorado
Populated places established in 1904